Robert Boyd Holbrook (born  September 1, 1981) is an American actor. He has starred in the Netflix series Narcos (2015-2017) as DEA agent Steve Murphy and The Sandman (2022-) as the Corinthian, as well as in the History miniseries Hatfields & McCoys as "Cap" Hatfield. He starred as Billy in The Skeleton Twins (2014), Peter Kristo in A Walk Among the Tombstones (2014), Donald Pierce in Logan (2017), Quinn McKenna in The Predator (2018), Pinkins in O.G. (2019),  Thomas Lockhart in In the Shadow of the Moon (2019), and Ty Shaw in Vengeance (2022).

Early life
Holbrook was born in Prestonsburg, Kentucky, the son of Ellen and Don Holbrook.

Career
Holbrook was discovered while working part-time as a carpenter for Jenny Wiley Theatre in Kentucky. He signed with Elite Models in 2001. He has worked for other agencies such as Wilhelmina Models. Holbrook has been a model for such designers and labels as Gucci, Jean Paul Gaultier, Versace, Hugo Boss, Bill Blass, Calvin Klein, Moschino, Marc Jacobs and DSquared².

Holbrook and model Omahyra Mota were the subjects of photographer Ellen Von Unwerth Paris gallery exhibition "Omahyra & Boyd" and the 2005 book of that title from Exhibitions International.

He released a short series of poems through the website Model-Max.com, accompanied by illustrations by Jamie Strachan.

Holbrook studied acting with the William Esper Studio's two-year Meisner Acting Program and with Shane Ann Younts' two-year voice and speech program, and he received an SCPS Certificate in 16mm film from New York University. He also has worked with acting coach Terry Knickerbocker.

His prior acting work includes a role in the "Allison" music video for Permanent Me alongside model Tiah Eckhardt.

Holbrook is a photographer who has done work for David Armstrong. He is also a sculptor and exhibited his work in his first art show, "Iscariot", at the Rare gallery in Chelsea, New York from April 19 to May 17, 2008.

In 2014, Holbrook appeared as Jeff in David Fincher's psychological thriller Gone Girl.

Holbrook portrayed DEA agent Steve Murphy in the Netflix series Narcos. In 2017, Holbrook played Donald Pierce, the antagonist in Logan, the sequel to The Wolverine. In 2019, Holbrook starred as Thomas Lockhart in the Netflix thriller film, In the Shadow of the Moon.

In January 2021, Holbrook was cast as The Corinthian in the Netflix adaptation of The Sandman.

In May 2021, Holbrook was cast in Indiana Jones and the Dial of Destiny.

Personal life
Holbrook has dated actress Elizabeth Olsen. They became engaged in March 2014, but in January 2015, they ended their engagement. He later married Tatiana Pajkovic, who is Danish, and the couple have a son.

Filmography

Film

Television

Video game

Awards and nominations

References

External links

 

1980s births
21st-century American male actors
Male models from Kentucky
American male film actors
American male television actors
Living people
Male actors from Kentucky
People from Prestonburg, Kentucky